Ramalina farinacea is an epiphytic bushy shaped (fruticose) lichen common to areas with Mediterranean, subtropical, or temperate climates. It is in the genus Ramalina of the family Ramalinaceae. The coexistence of two different species of the Trebouxia genus of green algae at the same time were found to be in each specimen collected in widely distributed populations. The algae thrive in different temperature and light environments. It is thought this demonstrates an ability of the lichen with two simultaneous green algae partners to proliferate in a wider range of habitats and geographic areas.

This lichen species is characterized by its long, narrow branches (less than 2 to 3 millimeters wide) and clearly defined marginal soralia. It is most often found at low elevations on trees and shrubs.

References

farinacea
Lichen species
Lichens described in 1753
Lichens of Europe
Lichens of North America
Taxa named by Carl Linnaeus